EC Kitzbuhel is an ice hockey team in Kitzbühel, Austria.

History
The club was founded in 1910. From 1965–1973, Kitzbuhel played in the Erste Bank Eishockey Liga, the top level of ice hockey in Austria. In their eight seasons there, the club never finished higher than third place, and in 1973, they were relegated to the Austrian Oberliga. In the 2014–15 season, the club joined the Inter-National League. After the dissolution of the competition, the club joined the Alps Hockey League for the 2016–17 season.

Season-by-season record

Achievements

 ASKÖ-Staatsliga champion: 1949, 1952, 1954
 Austrian Oberliga champion: 1976, 1996, 2004, 2005
 Tiroler Landesmeister: 1988, 2007

References
 Official website 
 EC Kitzbuhel profile on eliteprospects.com

Ice hockey teams in Austria
Inter-National League teams
Ice hockey clubs established in 1910
1910 establishments in Austria-Hungary
Former Austrian Hockey League teams
Establishments in the Empire of Austria (1867–1918)